The Church of St. Nicholas is a Neoclassical style rotunda in the Askold's Grave park of Kyiv, Ukraine. 

This former Russian Orthodox church was designed in 1809 by the Moscow-born architect Andrey Melensky and was underwritten by Samuil Meshcheryakov, a merchant from Voronezh. 

The general contractor for the project was Vasiliy Serikov. The construction cost 8,000 rubles and the church was consecrated on 1 September 1810.

Churches in Kyiv
Ukrainian Catholic churches in Ukraine
Churches completed in 1810
Rotundas in Europe
Neoclassical architecture in Kyiv
1810 establishments in Ukraine
Neoclassical church buildings in Ukraine